The FIM Scandinavian Speedway Grand Prix was the seventh race of the 2011 Speedway Grand Prix season. It took place on August 13 at the G&B Stadium in Målilla, Sweden.

Riders 
The Speedway Grand Prix Commission nominated Thomas H. Jonasson as Wild Card, and Simon Gustafsson and Linus Sundström both as Track Reserves. The Draw was made on August 12.

Results 
The Grand Prix was won by Pole Jarosław Hampel who beat Andreas Jonsson, Kenneth Bjerre and Emil Sayfutdinov in the final.

Heat details

Heat after heat 
 (55,90) Jonsson, Lindgren, Holder, Pedersen
 (56,17) Crump, Bjerre, Harris, Gollob
 (55,70) Hampel, Lindbäck, Kołodziej, Łaguta
 (56,10) Sayfutdinov, Holta, Hancock, Jonasson (Fx)
 (55,96) Crump, Lindgren, Jonasson, Łaguta
 (56,44) Bjerre, Sayfutdinov, Hampel, Pedersen
 (56,73) Harris, Jonsson, Hancock, Lindbäck
 (57,13) Holder, Holta, Gollob, Kołodziej
 (57,19) Bjerre, Lindgren, Lindbäck, Holta
 (57,68) Crump, Hancock, Pedersen, Kołodziej
 (57,96) Jonsson, Sayfutdinov, Gollob, Łaguta
 (57,74) Jonasson, Hampel, Harris, Holder
 (57,71) Sayfutdinov, Harris, Lindgren, Kołodziej
 (57,60) Jonasson, Lindbäck, Gollob, Pedersen
 (58,65) Crump, Jonsson, Hampel, Holta
 (57,79) Bjerre, Holder, Hancock, Łaguta
 (57,59) Hancock, Hampel, Lindgren, Gollob (R)
 (58,52) Harris, Pedersen, Łaguta, Holta
 (58,82) Jonsson, Jonasson, Bjerre (X), Kołodziej (Fx)
 (58,48) Crump, Lindbäck, Holder, Sayfutdinov (X)
 Semi-Finals:
 (56,93) Sayfutdinov, Hampel, Crump, Jonasson
 (58,36) Bjerre, Jonsson, Hancock, Harris
 the Final:
 (57,00) Hampel (6 points), Jonsson (4), Bjerre (2), Sayfutdinov (0)

The intermediate classification

See also 
 motorcycle speedway

References 

Speedway Grand Prix of Scandinavia
Scandinavia
2011